High Windows is a collection of poems by English poet Philip Larkin, and was published in 1974 by Faber and Faber Limited. The readily available paperback version was first published in Britain in 1979. The collection is the last publication of new poetry by Larkin before his death in 1985, and it contains some of his most famous poems, including the title piece, "High Windows", "Dublinesque", and "This Be The Verse". The collection contains themes presented in his earlier collections, though the tone of the poems caused critics to suggest the book is darker and more "socially engaged" than his earlier volumes.
It is currently on the AQA AS/A2 level English Literature syllabus.

Poems 
The volume contains 24 poems:

Critical reception
Clive James, in As of this writing, describes High Windows as Larkin's bleakest volume of poetry, though he does admit that there are aspects of the poetry that contain the humour found in Larkin's earlier books of poetry. James suggests that Larkin has never liked the idea of a poet "Developing" and that Larkin himself remains the same throughout his career as a poet. High Windows, in James's opinion, shows that Larkin simply strives, with the addition of each poem, to state more clearly the same principles shown by his early works and concludes that "The total impression of High Windows is of despair made beautiful."

References

English poetry collections
1974 poetry books
Poetry by Philip Larkin
Faber and Faber books